George Helon (born 1965), also known under the pen names George Wieslaw Helon and Jerzy Wieslaw Helon, is an Australian author, businessman, and historian of Polish descent. Helon is on the board of directors of the Polish Nobility Association Foundation.

He has written numerous ethnographic and etymological books, including Aboriginal Australia, The English-Gooreng/Gooreng-English Dictionary, and First Names of the Polish Commonwealth (which he co-authored with William F. Hoffman). He is also the founder and CEO of MedicReady, an international award winning company in Australia that produces accident and emergency medical data first response kits and cards.

Early life and education

George William Helon was born Wieslaw George Helon in 1965 in Bridgnorth, Shropshire, England. His family has noble Polish ancestry, and Helon is a hereditary Count and Nobleman of the Polish Kingdom and Polish-Lithuanian Commonwealth. He was born with a rare autosomal genetic disorder known as Pallister–Hall syndrome, the symptoms of which (including a rare pituitary tumour and gelastic seizures) he has experienced for his entire life.
 
His father, Zbigniew "Alan" Helon, was deported to a Gulag forced labor camp in Mucznaja, Archangelsk, Siberia with his family as a toddler in 1940. Zbigniew eventually emigrated to the United Kingdom where he met his future wife (and George's mother) Elzbieta (Elizabeth) Misiura. In 1970, the family left Wolverhampton to move to Melbourne where Zbigniew had been offered an engineering job at B.S.P. Planning & Design. George Helon attended St Patrick's College in Ballarat, Victoria between 1980 and 1982.

Life and career

Helon published several books of poetry and prose in 1984, including Book of Love and Destruction, Scattered Thoughts, and All for Dreamers. In the 1990 Australian federal election, Helon ran as an independent candidate for the Australian House of Representatives seat in the Division of Ballarat, losing to the Liberal Party of Australia candidate, Michael Ronaldson. In 1992, he moved to Bundaberg, Queensland with his family. In 1994, Helon's The English-Gooreng/Gooreng-English Dictionary was published. In October, the Gooreng Gooreng tribe honored Helon with the tribal name of Buralnyarla (White Owl). In December of that year, the dictionary was presented to the Australian Parliament's House of Representatives by the Federal Member for the Division of Hinkler, Paul Neville, who publicly acknowledged Helon's work
 
In 1997, Helon was a candidate for the Constitutional Monarchists in the Australian Constitutional Convention Election. By that time, he had also been registered as a Justice of the Peace (qualified) in Queensland. In 1998, Helon published 3 books: The Gooreng Gooreng Tribe of South-east Queensland, Aboriginal Australia, and First Names of the Polish Commonwealth. In 2001, Helon was hospitalized for 12 days with gelastic seizures and an inoperable 4.5-centimeter brain tumor associated with his Pallister-Hall syndrome. He moved with his family to Toowoomba in 2002 to be closer to medical specialists.
 
A hereditary Count and nobleman of the Polish Kingdom and Polish–Lithuanian Commonwealth, Helon was appointed as the Australian representative of the Polish Nobility Association Foundation in 2005. By 2008, he held titles such as the Marquis de Helon, Knight Commander (KCSG) of the Pontifical Equestrian Order of St. Gregory the Great, Knight of the Grand Cross of the Order of the Eagle of Georgia and the Seamless Tunic of Our Lord Jesus Christ, Grand Officer of the Vietnamese Imperial Order of the Dragon of Annam, and the Grand Cross of the Imperial Ethiopian Order of Saint Mary of Zion. Between 2012 and 2013, Helon served on the Toowoomba Regional Access and Disability Advisory Committee. In 2014, the Helon Theological Reference Library (a private theological and biblical library Helon founded) began displaying a 1:3 reproduction of the Ark of the Covenant.
 
On 8 May 2016, he founded MedicReady®, a company in Australia that produces accident and emergency medical data first response kits and cards that contain information about a patient's medical history. In 2018, he was named to The Toowoomba Chronicles "Power 100" list.

Awards

In 2016, Helon received the Freedom of the City of London.

On 17 April 2019, Helon was publicly recognised for his long service as a Justice of the Peace by the State of Queensland when the Shadow Attorney-General and Shadow Minister for Justice David Janetzki MP presented him with an award for 25 years of distinguished service as a Justice of the Peace.

Helon was commissioned a Kentucky Colonel on 15 April 2020 during the governorship of The Honourable Andy Beshear, Governor of the Commonwealth of Kentucky. Appointment as a Kentucky Colonel is the highest civilian honour the Governor of the Commonwealth of Kentucky can bestow.

Grant of Arms
George William Helon in the State of Queensland in the Commonwealth of Australia was granted Arms, Crest and Badge by Her Majesty’s College of Arms on 7 May 2020 by Letters Patent of Garter, Clarenceux and Norroy and Ulster Kings of Arms.

Controversy
On 1 December 2016 Helon ignited a national controversy in Australia after he circulated a picture on Twitter and Facebook featuring nine golliwog dolls  placed underneath a sign at a Terry White Chemists in Toowoomba which invited shoppers to "Experience a White Christmas." Helon told the Toowoomba Chronicle "It's a bit of a shocker, I walked past and thought – what?" “I showed a photo to other people and they said, ‘what the hell?’ I don't think there was any ill intent, it was just inappropriately placed."

Australian Aboriginal activist, author and filmmaker Stephen Hagan described Toowoomba as the "most racist city in Australia". Hagan told SBS news that "there's no place for Golliwogs in Australian society now. To me and to all people of colour, it's a depiction of a racist era when black people didn't have any rights."

Terry White Chemists subsequently banned the sale of such dolls from any franchise nationwide and the franchisee "unreservedly apologised" for the "regrettable error".

Bibliography

References

External links
Official website

Living people
1965 births
Australian businesspeople
Australian historians
Australian monarchists
Australian people of Polish descent
People from Bridgnorth